Rathaniska, also known as Baile Marlainn or Marlinstown, is a townland in County Westmeath, Ireland.

Rathaniska is one of 15 townlands of the civil parish of Leny in the barony of Corkaree in the Province of Leinster. The neighbouring townlands are: Leny to the north, Rathbennett to the east, Farrow to the south and Ballyvade to the west.

In the 1911 census of Ireland there were 3 houses and 8 inhabitants in the townland.

References

External links
The IreAtlas Townland Data Base
Rathaniska at Townlands.ie
Rathaniska at Logainm.ie

Townlands of County Westmeath